"Merry Christmas" is a song by English singer-songwriters Ed Sheeran and Elton John. It was released through Asylum and Atlantic Records as a single on 3 December 2021. The song appears on the Christmas edition of John's collaborative album, The Lockdown Sessions, and originally appeared on the now-removed Christmas edition of Sheeran's fifth studio album, =. Sheeran and John wrote the song alongside its producer, Steve Mac.  "Merry Christmas" entered at the top of the UK Singles Chart during the chart week of 10 December 2021, becoming Sheeran's twelfth chart-topper in the country and John's ninth number-one single in the country. It also topped the charts in the Flanders region of Belgium, Ireland, the Netherlands and Switzerland.

Background and promotion
"Merry Christmas" is Sheeran's first Christmas song, and John's second Christmas single, following the release of 1973's "Step into Christmas", although Sheeran had previously co-written the 2016 Christmas song "When Christmas Comes Around" by English singer Matt Terry. In an interview with NPO Radio 2 in October 2021, Sheeran revealed that John asked him to do a song with him the previous year after the success of "Step into Christmas". He also recalled writing the chorus of the song the same day he was asked by John.

On 29 November 2021, Sheeran and John both announced the collaboration and its release date. They also stated that all proceeds from the song in the United Kingdom will go towards donations for the Ed Sheeran Suffolk Music Foundation and the Elton John AIDS Foundation. In November 2021, on an appearance on The Tonight Show Starring Jimmy Fallon, Sheeran revealed that he went to stay with John after writing the song's chorus, in which they ended up making three Christmas songs together with "Merry Christmas" being one of them.

Music video 
The official music video for "Merry Christmas" was premiered to Sheeran's YouTube channel alongside its release on 3 December 2021. Re-creating a scene from the festive romantic-comedy film Love Actually, the video sees Sheeran and John pay homage to scenes from British Christmas hits from the past, including "Last Christmas", "Walking in the Air", "I Wish It Could Be Christmas Everyday", "Merry Christmas Everyone" , and "Stay Another Day". Several people made a cameo in the video including Jonathan Ross, Michael McIntyre, Big Narstie, Mr. Blobby and the Darkness.

Commercial performance
The song debuted at number one on 10 December 2021, knocking "Easy on Me" by Adele off the number one spot after 7 consecutive weeks. The song stayed at number one for two weeks. The song became 2021's Christmas number two single on 24 December 2021, having been knocked off the top spot by "Sausage Rolls for Everyone" by LadBaby, a parody of "Merry Christmas" which features both Sheeran and John. As a result, 2021 became the first year that the Christmas number one and two singles were two versions of the same song by the same artists.

On 31 December 2021, "Sausage Rolls For Everyone" was replaced at number one by "Merry Christmas", when LadBaby dropped to number 29 in the charts. "Merry Christmas" was one of five hits Sheeran was credited on that week, as the Official Charts Company added Sheeran to the credit of Fireboy DML's single "Peru" when the remix debuted in the Top 40, one position higher than LadBaby's single, at number 28. On 7 January 2022, "Merry Christmas" became the first record with SCR streaming status (Standard Chart Ratio) to completely drop out of the Top 100 from number one, exiting at the same time as "Sausage Rolls For Everyone". It was replaced in the chart (as one of Sheeran's three main credited titles) by "Bad Habits" at number 12, joining "Overpass Graffiti" and "Shivers" in the chart at number 11 and 10 (though "Peru" was higher at number 6). If "Merry Christmas" had not been excluded from the Top 40 because of the primary artist rule, the record would have been around number 38 after amassing 8,271 sales that week.

According to figures released by Music Week, for the week starting 7 January 2022, when Adele returned to number one from number 38, Sheeran could have replaced himself at number one again with "Shivers" as this record had a full sales total of 40,879 units, compared to Adele's 39,156 units. However, unlike Adele who was given a reset to a SCR (Standard Chart Ratio) streaming status, "Shivers" status was set at ACR (Accelerated Chart Ratio) and so ended up in tenth place with a total of 21,405 after his streams were halved.

LadBaby version

In December 2021, English blogger couple LadBaby released a comedy version of the song titled "Sausage Rolls For Everyone with a sausage roll theme as a charity single whose proceeds go to The Trussell Trust. It was released as a single on 17 December 2021. Both Sheeran and John are featured on the song.

The song debuted at number one on the UK Singles Chart on 24 December 2021, giving LadBaby their fourth consecutive Christmas number one, Sheeran his second (after 2017's "Perfect") and John his first.

Charts

Charts

Weekly charts

Year-end charts

Certifications

See also
 List of Billboard Adult Contemporary number ones of 2022

References

2021 songs
2021 singles
British Christmas songs
Dutch Top 40 number-one singles
Ed Sheeran songs
Elton John songs
Irish Singles Chart number-one singles
Number-one singles in Switzerland
Songs written by Ed Sheeran
Songs written by Steve Mac
Song recordings produced by Steve Mac
Songs with music by Elton John
Asylum Records singles
Atlantic Records singles
UK Singles Chart number-one singles
Ultratop 50 Singles (Flanders) number-one singles
Male vocal duets